The ES Sétif–USM Alger rivalry is a football rivalry between Sétif-based ES Sétif and USM Alger of Algiers. The two clubs together won 42 titles from the Ligue Professionnelle 1, Algerian Cup and Super Cup at the local level, Regionally the Arab Champions League And internationally in CAF Champions League, CAF Super Cup and the defunct Afro-Asian Club Championship.

History

The beginning (1958–1977)

Union sportive de la médina d'Alger is an Algerian professional football club based in Algiers, Algiers Province. The club was formed in Casbah in 1937 as Union Sportive Musulmane d'Alger, as for Entente Sportive Sétifienne based in Sétif, Sétif Province. The club was formed in 1958 as Entente Sportive Sétifienne, It is the second Algerian club created during the revolution after the Entente Sportive de Collo (in 1957). ES Sétif and USM Alger are considered among the most successful Algerian football teams, especially since the beginning of the era of professionalism 2010–11 season. They are the first champions of Algeria in the Algerian Cup and the championship season 1962–63. The first official meeting between the two teams was in the semi-finald of the Algerian Cup in 1963, which ended with the victory of ES Sétif 4–2. The first match in the league tournament was during the 1964–65 season, which ended with the victory of ESS with a single goal.

First professional era (1977–1989)
In 1977 a sports reform was carried out as intended by the Ministry of Youth and Sports, in order to give the elite clubs a good financial base allowing them to structure themselves professionally (in ASP Which means Association Sportive de Performances). The aim was therefore that they should have full management autonomy with the creation of their own training center. ES Sétif sponsored by the national hydrocarbon company Sonatrach which induces the change of its name which becomes Entente Pétrolière de Sétif (EPS), then in 1984 the club changes sponsorship to adopt the company plastic national, so the name of the club changes again and becomes Entente Plastique de Sétif (EPS). as for USM Alger sponsors the club and change the name to Union sportive kahraba d'Alger (USK Alger), meaning electricity who had inherited the Société nationale de l'électricité et du gaz company (Sonelgaz). The matches between the two teams were not exciting in the 1970s until the 1990s, and in this period met in the 1980 Algerian cup final which ended with the victory of ES Sétif and its fifth title with a score of 1–0, which was the seventh final of the USMA is defeated after that. The matches between the two teams were not much because of the repeated fall of the clubs to the second division, but in the 1988 ES Sétif won the African Cup of Champions Clubs for the first time, while playing in the second division against Iwuanyanwu Nationale of Nigeria and after the defeat in the First leg 1–0, they achieved an overwhelming victory in the Second leg 4–0 in a match that took place at Stade du 17 Juin in Constantine, After that, they met with Al Sadd SC in the final of the Afro-Asian Club Championship, and won the title, which is the only one of its kind in the history of Algerian football.

Second professional era (since 2010)

It was decided by the Ligue de Football Professionnel and the Algerian Football Federation to professionalize the Algerian football championship, starting from the 2010–11 season Thus all the Algerian football clubs which until then enjoyed the status of semi-professional club, will acquire the professional appointment this season. the president of the Algerian Football Federation, Mohamed Raouraoua, has been speaking since his inauguration as the federation's president in Professionalism, USM Alger become the first professional club in Algeria businessman Ali Haddad became the majority share owner after investing 700 million Algeria dinars to buy an 83% ownership in the club. Since the beginning of the professional era, both teams have achieved all league titles except for the first season, which was won by ASO Chlef Until the 2016–17 season. The two teams also met in the Algerian Super Cup final for the first time in 2014 which ended with the victory of USM Alger Algerian Cup champion with a 2–0 scored by Ziaya and Andria. In 2014 ES Sétif achieved their first CAF Champions League title in their new version as the first Algerian team a year later. USM Alger reached the final but failed to achieve its first continental title after it was defeated against TP Mazembe. In the same competition, the two teams met during the group stage as the first two Algerian teams to compete in a continental competition. The first was in the first round in a Ramadan night and ended with the victory of USM Alger 2–1. In the second leg, they also finished with a 3–0 victory, their fifth consecutive win, to qualify for the semi-finals in the first place. 

On 28 February 2018 Ali Haddad replaced his brother Rabouh as a post general manager by former international and former ES Setif player and president Abdelhakim Serrar. In the Algerian Cup on 22 January 2019, the two teams met for the first time in 12 years at Stade 8 Mai 1945. The match ended with a win by ES Sétif 3–1. That was their first win in the Algerian cup against USM Alger since 1980. On May 26, 2019, USM Alger after the victory outside the home against CS Constantine 3–1 achieved the eighth Ligue 1 title. immediately after the end of the game Serrar announced his resignation from his office. On March 2, 2020, after it was expected that the USM Alger general assembly of shareholders will be on March 12, 2020, especially after the imprisonment of the former club president, Rabouh Haddad. The meeting witnessed the attendance of ETRHB Haddad representative and the absence of the amateur club president Saïd Allik, after two and a half hours, it was announced that Groupe SERPORT had bought the shares of ETRHB Haddad which amounted to 94.34%. On June 9, 2022 Madjid Bougherra manager of the Algeria A' national team decided to lay off the players for one day. USM Alger player Billel Benhammouda on the road between Douaouda and Bou Ismaïl, he had a fatal traffic accident. The next day after a DNA examination his death was announced. While they moved to Setif to play the last round match of the 2021–22 season the team returned after hearing this collision news, Ligue de Football Professionnel (LFP) granted the request to postpone the match to a later date. due to the difficult psychological state of the main players USM Alger will appear in this match with players from the reserve and the under-19 category (U19).

On August 22, 2022 former ES Sétif captain Akram Djahnit and after 12 years decided to leave, where he joined USM Alger, Djahnit decided to submitting his case to the National Dispute Resolution Chamber which agreed with him, therefore terminating his contract.

All-time head-to-head results

All-Time Top Scorers

All-Time Top appearances
Bold Still playing competitive football in Algeria
since 1999–2000 season.
Statistics correct as of game on 3 December 2022

Honours

League matches

Algerian Cup results

Super Cup results

League Cup results

International results

Shared player history

Players who have played for both clubs

  Hamza Aït Ouamar (USM Alger 2009–11, ES Sétif 2016–18)
  Farouk Belkaïd (USM Alger 2005–06, ES Sétif 2008–13)
  Antar Boucherit (USM Alger 2006–08, ES Sétif 2010–11)
  Abdelhamid Kermali (USM Alger 1951–52, ES Sétif 1966–67)
  Ahmed Gasmi (USM Alger 2012–14, ES Sétif 2014–15)
  Azzedine Rahim (USM Alger 1987–00, ES Sétif 2003–2004)
  Mokhtar Benmoussa (ES Sétif 2010–12, USM Alger 2012–19)
  Rafik Bouderbal (ES Sétif 2009–10, USM Alger 2016–19)
  Khaled Lemmouchia (ES Sétif 2006–11, USM Alger 2011–12)
  Abdelkader Laïfaoui (ES Sétif 2007–11, USM Alger 2011–15)
  Saâdi Radouani (USM Alger 2015–16 & 2020–present, ES Sétif 2018–20)
  Messala Merbah (ES Sétif 2020–21, USM Alger 2021–present)
  Bouazza Feham (ES Sétif 2008–11, USM Alger 2011–15)
  Lamouri Djediat (ES Sétif 2007–10, USM Alger 2011–14)
  Adel Maïza (ES Sétif 2005–08, USM Alger 2012)
  Farès Mecheri (ES Sétif 2007–08, USM Alger 2008–09)
  Rachid Nadji (ES Sétif 2011–14 & 2016–18, USM Alger 2014–16)
  Mohamed Seguer (ES Sétif 2008–10, USM Alger 2012–16)
  Mohamed Yekhlef (ES Sétif 2005–11, USM Alger 2011–13)
  Abdelmalek Ziaya (ES Sétif 2005–10 & 2014–16, USM Alger 2013–14)
  Isâad Bourahli (ES Sétif 1992–95 & 1998–01 & 2003–04 & 2005–07, USM Alger 2001–03 & 2004–05 & 2007–10)
  Ibrahim Bekakchi (USM Alger 2011–14 & 2021–present, ES Sétif 2019–21)
  Akram Djahnit (ES Sétif 2010–15 & 2016–22, USM Alger 2022–present)

Coaches who managed both clubs

  Azzedine Aït Djoudi (USM Alger 2002–03, ES Sétif 2008–09)
  Hubert Velud (ES Sétif 2012–13, USM Alger 2013–15)
  Noureddine Saâdi (USM Alger 1996–97 & 2000–02 & 2004–05 & 2009–10, ES Sétif 2007)
  Rabah Saâdane (USM Alger 1999–2000, ES Sétif 2006–07)

Algerian Ligue Professionnelle 1 results

The tables list the place each team took in each of the seasons.

References

ES Sétif
USM Alger
Football rivalries in Algeria